Response elements are short sequences of DNA within a gene promoter or enhancer region that are able to bind specific transcription factors and regulate transcription of genes.

Under conditions of stress, a transcription activator protein binds to the response element and stimulates transcription. If the same response element sequence is located in the control regions of different genes, then these genes will be activated by the same stimuli, thus producing a coordinated response.

Hormone response element
A hormone response element (HRE) is a short sequence of DNA within the promoter of a gene, that is able to bind to a specific hormone receptor complex and therefore regulate transcription. The sequence is most commonly a pair of inverted repeats separated by three nucleotides, which also indicates that the receptor binds as a dimer. Specifically, HRE responds to steroid hormones, as the activated steroid receptor is the transcription factor binding HRE. This regulates the transcription of genes signalled by the steroid hormone.

A gene may have many different response elements, allowing complex control to be exerted over the level and rate of transcription.

HRE are used in transgenic animal cells as inducers of gene expression.

Examples of HREs include estrogen response elements and androgen response elements.

Examples
Examples of response elements include:
 Nuclear receptor response elements – two 6-meric repeats for dimeric binding
 Type 2 NR response elements: direct repeat RGKTCA motifs, canonically AGGTCA
 Vitamin D response element (VDRE)
 Retinoic acid response elements (RAREs) 
 ROR-response element
 Thyroid hormone response element  
 Growth hormone response element (GHRE) 
 Peroxisome proliferator hormone response elements (PPREs) 
 Type 1 NR response elements (typical of hormone response elements) – inverted repeat
 estrogen response elements (EREs)
 androgen response elements (AREs)
 Glucocorticoid response element (GRE)
cAMP response element (CRE)
B recognition element
AhR-, dioxin- or xenobiotic- responsive element 
Hypoxia-responsive elements 
Serum response element (SRE) 
Metal-responsive element (MRE) 
DNA damage response element (DRE) 
IFN-stimulated response elements (ISREs)
Calcium-response element CaRE1 
Antioxidant response element (ARE) 
p53 response element 
Sterol regulatory element
Polycomb Response Elements (PREs) 
Rev response element (RRE)
Wnt response element (WRE), core CTTTG

References

External links
 

DNA